Yavuz Hilmi Çetin (25 September 1970 – 15 August 2001) was a Turkish musician, singer, and songwriter in the blues and psychedelic music genres. He gained renown in his native country for the skill and sensitivity of his guitar performances. Following his suicide at the age of 30, before the release of his highly praised album, Satılık [For Sale], Çetin achieved a near-iconic posthumous status as a talent lost on the brink of great achievement. Also, he is one of the most known Anatolian blues singers.

Musical training
Born in the Black Sea port of Samsun, Turkey's 15th largest city and capital of Samsun Province, Yavuz Çetin spent his early school years traveling through the country's various regions, as his father, journalist Erdal Çetin, responded to the demands inherent in the profession.  In 1984, at the age of 14, the adolescent music enthusiast was already taking blues and rock guitar lessons from guitarist Ahmet Kanneci and, the following year, started learning to master the acoustic guitar and, subsequently, the electric guitar. Before graduating from Istanbul's Haydarpaşa High School, he and classmate Ercan Saatçi who, in later years, became a noted musician as well as sports journalist, entered HEY magazine's music competition and their song, "I Will Cry", became the winning entry.

In 1988, continuing his quest in Istanbul for higher education and advanced musical training, Çetin began studies at Marmara University's Music Department while earning an income as a musical performer in clubs such as Beyaz Ev [White House] in the port town of Bodrum, where he played in 1989–90. In 1991, upon turning 21, he formed, with young musical colleagues Batu Mutlugil, Kerim Çaplı and Sunay Özgür, the musical group, Blue Blues Band.  Having married in 1992, Yavuz Çetin and wife Didem filed for divorce four years later.  In that year, 1996, and for the remaining four years of his life, he was also a guitarist at the numerous concerts played by the noted band Mazhar-Fuat-Özkan.

He collaborated, as well, on various albums with artists such as Teoman, Kıraç, Sibel Tüzün, Soner Arıca, Göksel, Deniz Arcak and Acil Servis. In Göksel's hit song "Sabır", he became the first Turkish guitar player to use a talk box.  Of particular note is his solo on Deniz Arcak's "Bırakın Beni" from the Kıpır Kıpır album which, in an illustration of his mastery of the rock and blues guitar tradition, was recorded on the first take after only a couple of rehearsals.  It also became the last studio session recording in which he participated.

Two albums, İlk and Satılık
In 1997, Yavuz Çetin issued his first album İlk, produced by his longtime compatriot Ercan Saatçi, but the album was unable to capture the spirit of that moment's public musical mood.  He also earned an income from writing numerous advertising jingles, such as a well-remembered Coca-Cola spot, and his tune "Dünya" ["the World"], which was chosen as part of the soundtrack for the 1999 film, "Propaganda", with a score composed and arranged by master guitarist Erkan Oğur.

Six weeks before his 31st birthday, after expending months of intense effort writing all of the tracks for his second album, Satılık, and having completed the album's final recording session, Yavuz Çetin committed suicide by leaping from Istanbul's Boğaziçi Bridge which connects Europe and Asia across the Bosphorus strait.  Posthumous acclaim followed the subsequent release of the album which a number of music reviewers described as a work of genius.  With the passage of years, both Satılık and the previously overlooked İlk ve Son... have gained a near-cult status as Yavuz Çetin's music and words continue to be heard in the region keeping his legend alive for the listening public.

Discography
İlk (Stop Productions) (1997)
Erkeğin Olmak İstiyorum (I want to be your man)
Bilmem Neden İnat Ettim (I don't know why I persisted)
Sahil (Coast)
Bodrum Gecesi Yüzünden (Because of the Bodrum Night)
Kimse Bilemez (Nobody can know)
Gecenin Rengi (Colour of the Night)
Ağlamayı Sevmem (I don't like crying)
Çok İstiyorum (I want it so badly)
Onun Şarkısı (Her Song)
Hisset Beni (Feel Me)
Fanki Tonki Zonki (Instrumental)
Dünya (The World)

Satılık (Tmc Müzik) (2001)
Cherokee
Benimle Uçmak İster misin? (Would you like to fly with me?)
Oyuncak Dünya (Toy World)
Bul Beni (Find Me)
Sadece Senin Olmak (To be only yours)
Yaşamak İstemem (I don't want to live)
Kurtar Beni (Save Me)
Köle (Slave)
İstanbul'a Ait (It belongs to Istanbul)
Herşey Biter (Everything ends)

References

External links
[ Karaege, Vefik (2009). Yavuz Çetin biographical and career overview at ''All Music Guide']
Yavuz Cetin'e Dair... (dead poet for him) {in Turkish}
Music video at DailyMotion of Yavuz Çetin's "Yaşamak İstemem" from Satılık

1970 births
2001 suicides
Haydarpaşa High School alumni
People from Samsun
Suicides by jumping in Turkey
Turkish rock guitarists
Blues guitarists
Turkish rock singers
20th-century Turkish male singers
20th-century guitarists
Anatolian blues